The American Moving Labor Professionals Association (AMLPA) is the non-profit trade association representing moving labor companies moving industry based in the United States and Canada.  With approximately 150 member companies they consist of fully licensed moving companies, moving labor services, and vendors to the moving industry suppliers.

The AMLPA offers moving labor services varying levels of a quality certification program, aimed at consumers. Federal and local statutes regulating the moving labor industry are almost non-existent so the AMLPA acts as a non-profit group to set standards for its members.

History 

The AMLPA was formed with three goals. To set standards for the moving labor industry which at this time is relatively unregulated, to raise consumer awareness about an alternative to traditional moving companies, to form a body of industry professionals and gain market share while differentiating themselves from unlicensed and uninsured day laborers.

On October 6, 2016 the link to the AMLPA website reported:  "The AMLPA is no longer in operation. We apologize for any inconvenience."

Membership
 
Member companies include local and national companies that offer moving labor services. Members must abide by an ethical code of conduct and comply with any state laws, federal transportation safety regulations or consumer protection regulations.

Notes

References

External links 
AMLPA (association home page)

Moving and relocation
Trade associations based in the United States